Kornbread Jeté, also known as Kornbread "The Snack" Jeté or simply Kornbread, is the stage name of Demoria Elise Williams (born January 14, 1992), an American drag queen. She is known for competing on season 14 of RuPaul's Drag Race in 2022.

Early life and education
Williams was born and raised in Columbia, South Carolina. She later moved to Los Angeles to study musical theatre.

Career
As of 2022, Kornbread works at The Abbey in Los Angeles, and hosts weekly Drag Race watch parties at West Hollywood's Abbey Food & Bar. 

In 2022, she competed on season 14 of RuPaul's Drag Race. She performed an original song routine for the opening episode's talent show and won the challenge, which came with a cash prize of $5,000. In her routine, she used a milk carton with former Drag Race judge Merle Ginsberg depicted as a missing person. In the fifth episode, it was announced that Kornbread had to withdraw from the competition after rolling her ankle the week prior, ultimately coming in 11th Place. At the finale, she was announced as Season 14's Miss Congeniality, having been chosen by her fellow contestants, and won a $10,000 cash prize. Kornbread, along with fellow RuPaul's Drag Race alumni Ginger Minj and Kahmora Hall, appeared in the 2022 film Hocus Pocus 2.

She has appeared in videos with Brandon Rogers and Fine Brothers Entertainment, and has been featured in Thrillist.

Personal life
Kornbread is a transgender woman. She is close friends with Kerri Colby, a fellow Drag Race contestant and trans woman. Kornbread has said of Colby, "She's literally walked me through so much of my transition that no one understands how much she's done for me personally. She's not my drag mom, but I tell her she's definitely partly my trans mom."

Kornbread is the drag daughter of Calypso Jeté Balmain who won the first season of Legendary with the House of Balmain.

On September 26, 2022, Kornbread announced via an Instagram post that she had been diagnosed with an early stage adenocarcinoma, a type of intestinal cancer, and used her experience to raise awareness of the disease.

Filmography

Film

Television

Music videos

Internet series

Awards and nominations

See also
 List of LGBT African Americans
 List of people from Los Angeles
 List of transgender people

References

External links

 Kornbread Jete at IMDb

Living people
African-American drag queens
LGBT African Americans
LGBT people from California
LGBT people from South Carolina
People from Los Angeles
RuPaul's Drag Race contestants
American transgender people
Transgender women
Transgender drag performers
Participants in American reality television series
1992 births